Jeana may refer to:
 Jeana (moth), a genus of moth of the family Hepialidae
 Jeana (given name)